In mathematics,  Tate pairing is any  of several closely related bilinear pairings involving elliptic curves or abelian varieties, usually over local or finite fields, based on the Tate duality pairings introduced by   and extended by .  applied the Tate pairing over finite fields to cryptography.

See also
 Weil pairing

References

Pairing-based cryptography
Elliptic curve cryptography
Elliptic curves